Guerreros Unidos is a Mexican criminal syndicate in the states of Southern Mexico.

In 2014, the cartel kidnapped 43 students from Ayotzinapa College in Iguala, Guerrero. A witness confirmed that soldiers in the Mexican Army were involved in the kidnapping, by interrogating the students at the army base in the town of Iguala and then handing them over to the cartel.

History
The Guerreros Unidos were founded in 2010 as two factions from La Familia Michoacana merged an alliance with different cartels. One faction chose sides with the Tijuana, Beltrán-Leyva, Juárez and Los Zetas cartels. Another chose alliances with the Gulf and Sinaloa Cartels. The faction that chose sides with the Sinaloa and Gulf cartels rivals formed Guerreros Unidos with the remains of the Beltrán Leyva Cartel. Before the kidnapping of the 43 students, it was suspected of attacking a bus of Ayotzinapa activists on 11 December 2011, with Guerrero state militia and police.

2014 Iguala kidnapping
On 26 September 2014, students from Ayotzinapa College were assisting a protest in Mexico City to commemorate the 46th anniversary of the Tlatelolco massacre. Under orders from the mayor, Iguala Municipal Police, Federal Ministerial Police, Mexican Federal Police, various members from SEDENA, and Guerrero State Police carjacked a bus carrying them to Mexico City. They shot the bus windows killing six students. Witnesses that survived the ordeal described they were taken to the Mexican army base in town, and then the commander decided who would be killed or left alive. The mayor was then arrested a few months later on November 4, 2014, by PGR and SEIDO agents.

References

Organizations established in 2010
2010 establishments in Mexico
Drug cartels in Mexico
Mexican drug war